Samuel Spearing (born 1823/3)  served in the Florida Senate during the Reconstruction era. He represented Duval County in the state senate in 1874. According to one source he was known as Uncle Sam. He also served as a collector of revenue. 

Spearing represented the 18th district in the State Senate.

See also
List of African-American officeholders during the Reconstruction era

References

Date of birth unknown
Date of death unknown
Florida state senators
African-American state legislators in Florida